Tell Abyad Subdistrict or Tell Abyad Nahiyah  is a Syrian nahiyah (subdistrict) located in Tell Abyad District in Raqqa.  According to the Syria Central Bureau of Statistics (CBS), Tell Abyad Subdistrict had a population of 44,671 in the 2004 census. The subdistrict's administrative center (seat) is the town of Tell Abyad and is controlled by the Syrian Interim Government.

References 

Subdistricts of Raqqa Governorate